Masdevallia triangularis is a species of orchid found from Venezuela to Ecuador. It grows to approximately 10 cm tall, and bears flat, solitary flowers above the leaves. It is more warmth tolerant than many other species in subsection Caudatae, and can be cultivated successfully in intermediate conditions.

External links

 

triangularis
Orchids of Ecuador
Orchids of Venezuela